Meath County Council is the authority responsible for local government in County Meath, Ireland. As a county council, it is governed by the Local Government Act 2001. The council is responsible for housing and community, roads and transportation, urban planning and development, amenity and culture, and environment. The council has 40 elected members. Elections are held every five years and are by single transferable vote. The head of the council has the title of Cathaoirleach (Chairperson). The county administration is headed by a Chief Executive, Jackie Maguire. The county town is Navan.

History
Meath County Council commissioned a purpose-built headquarters at Railway Street in Navan in the early 20th century. It then moved to more modern facilities at the new County Hall on the Dublin Road in Navan in 2017.

Local Electoral Areas and Municipal Districts
Meath County Council is divided into the following municipal districts and local electoral areas, defined by electoral divisions.

Councillors

2019 seats summary

Councillors by electoral area
This list reflects the order in which councillors were elected on 24 May 2019.

Notes

Co-options

References

External links

Politics of County Meath
County councils in the Republic of Ireland